Events from the year 1725 in Denmark.

Incumbents
 Monarch – Frederick IV
 Grand Chancellor – Ulrik Adolf Holstein

Events
 1 October  The County of  Scheel is established by Christen Skeel from the manors of Sostrup, Skærvad, Ørbækgaard, Steensmark, Debildhede, Skiern and Karmark.

Undated

Births
 May 16 – Peder Als, painter (died 1776)
 1 December Frederik Christian Kaas, naval officer (died 1803)

References

 
Years of the 18th century in Denmark
Denmark
Denmark
1720s in Denmark